{{nihongo|Notebook I: Mirai no Kioku|NOTEBOOK I～未来の記憶～|Future Memories|pronounced Nōtobukku Wan Mirai no Kioku''''}} is Kurumi Enomoto's debut studio album, released on . It debuted at #70 on the Japanese Oricon album charts, and charted in the top 300 for a single week.

The album was preceded by four singles, though only two charted. These two, "Rainbow Dust" and "Aisubeki Hito", were theme songs for minor dramas (Sweets Dream, and the Fuji TV mudra internet streaming drama Aisubeki Hito'' respectively).

Track listing

Japan sales rankings

References
 	

Kurumi Enomoto albums
2007 debut albums